Doom 2099 (Victor Von Doom) is a fictional anti-hero appearing in American comic books published by Marvel Comics. The character was primarily featured in the Marvel 2099 series Doom 2099. The character is based on Doctor Doom, created by Stan Lee and Jack Kirby. The series was written by John Francis Moore for its first two years, and by Warren Ellis for its third.

Publication history
Doom first appeared in Marvel Comics Presents #118, in a preview of Doom 2099 #1. Doom 2099 would run for 44 issues (January 1993 – August 1996), with Doom making notable appearances in 2099 Unlimited, 2099: World of Tomorrow, Ghost Rider 2099, Hulk 2099, Punisher 2099, Ravage 2099, Spider-Man 2099, and X-Men 2099. Doom also received his own special one-shot after conquering the United States, titled 2099 A.D.

Fictional character biography
In the year 2099, Doctor Doom abruptly materializes via an energy sphere in the ruins of Castle Doom in Latveria, after disappearing 50–100 years before. Latveria is now in the hands of a cyborg mercenary robber-baron, Tyger Wylde. Doom confronts the new dictator of the nation, but is quickly defeated by Wylde's superior technology — his armor depleted of energy and destroyed, and his face is scarred. Left for dead, Doom finds refuge with the last remnants of his gypsy tribe, the Zefiro, via  the seeress Fortune. With the aid of a brilliant Pixel employee he liberates from corporate enslavement named Dr. Celia Quinones, Doom creates a new, far more advanced and powerful suit of silver, blue cloaked armor capable of competing with Wylde's futuristic technology, in addition to performing neurocybersurgery on him. Doom becomes a freedom fighter, and successfully strikes back against an increasingly more frustrated Tiger Wylde. Doom stole Wylde's shipment of tritonium, an unstable radioactive mineral, useful both as a regenerating explosive and as a power source (so powerful that a large handful could power Latveria for fifty years), thereby prompting Wylde to attack. Alongside his few Zefiro allies, and with the use of the tritonium he has seized, Doom is able to defeat and destroy Wylde and regain control of his homeland to once again become Monarch of Latveria, ruling once more from a rebuilt Castle Doom, built "as a bridge between the village of Antikva and the metropolis of Gojradia" (apparently an expanded and advanced Doomstadt) once again. Doom then decides that the world has become chaotic and corrupt, and to save it, he must conquer it. Doom is assisted by several Zefiro Gypsies:

 Fortune, a Zefiro fortune teller and former advisor of Wylde.
 Wire, a "Cybersavant", capable of finding information on the worldwide Cyberweb.
 Xandra, Wire's girlfriend and a Wakandan soldier. Adopted into the Zefiro.
 Vox, the Zefiro's magical adept. A mute boy who has one of the Eyes of Agamotto.
 Poet, Fortune's former lover and capable martial artist, not a Zefiro.

Doom secretly observes this era's Spider-Man. Doom travels into Cyberspace alongside Wire; there he battles Fever, the Virtual Reality Fantastic Four, Catscan, Haze, Paloma, and Duke Stratosphere. Several weeks later, Doom conquers the country Myridia.

The real Doom
Throughout the first half of the series there was speculation that Doom may not be the real Victor Von Doom. Doom was younger than the real Victor would be, his face was unscarred (when he first materialized), and his memory was fragmented; he had no recollection of how he came to 2099, and only a few memories of conflict with the Fantastic Four. Doom would later in the series recall the end of the "Age of Heroes", killing Reed Richards, growing old, and some vague memories of a war.
 
Ultimately, despite much speculation, the truth behind Doom 2099's identity was finally, definitively established as being the true, albeit alternate future version of Earth 616 Victor Von Doom on the final page of Doom 2099 Issue #25.

One Nation Under Doom
With his mind restored, Doom set out to conquer the United States, but by now he had lost several of his allies: Wire's body had died, though his mind lived on in Cyberspace; Poet died battling drug-traders; and Xandra had left to train in Wakanda. Doom conquered the US in issue #29 and left behind Fortune as regent in Latveria. As president, Doom fought against Alchemax, the Pixel Corporation, and the other corporations who controlled all aspects of everyday life in 2099. Doom recreates S.H.I.E.L.D., assigning Junkpile to take down the Red Market (illegal trade in humans for experimentation). He also made the X-Men 2099 the law enforcers of Halo City, a place where mutants and humans could live in peace. After Doom conquered the US, all 2099 titles added the letters A.D. (Anno Doom) to their titles.

Rage Against Time
Doom returned to Myridia, the world's source of information, hoping to find a way to save Latveria. He traveled back to the 20th century, battling his own present day self, as well as the 20th century Daredevil and Namor.  Despite this, he successfully introduces an addictive crab venom to his country, leading the populace to develop an immunity to the necrotoxin in an effort to save his people in the future. He returned to 2099, to find Fortune and about 50% of the population of Latveria alive, due to the genetic immunity, though many Latverians had been mutated into humanoid creatures dubbed "mutalocos". Immediately upon his return, Doom is greeted by the Phalanx, who had returned to Earth to attempt assimilation of the human race again. Against the advice of Fortune's brother, Kaz, Doom agrees to aid the Phalanx in finding sleeper agents they had left on the planet to have a better chance at assimilation, though it would seem that Doom is merely lying to further his own goals. This storyline ends the Doom 2099 book and continues in the 2099: World of Tomorrow book, which combined all running 2099 titles into one.

2099: World of Tomorrow
The Doom 2099 character was one of many to appear in the new title 2099: World of Tomorrow. Castle Doom had survived the ice caps melting, being one of the few places still above water. Doom is seemingly in league with Magus, the emissary of the Phalanx, assisting him in finding the scout which contains a code that will begin the Phalanx assimilation. In reality Doom has been experimenting on humans, with the help of Xena Kwan, former lover of Miguel O'Hara, to find a way of purging the Techno Organic Virus. Spider-Man eventually arrives and Doom blackmails him into assisting their experiments, claiming to be in possession of Miguel's brother. Magus reveals he has known all along where the scout, Nostromo of X-Nation, has been and that contact is at hand. Miguel and Xena successfully introduce and purge the virus from Doom's neurotech armor. He claims that he had always intended to allow the Phalanx to find Nostromo, as the techno organic growth has purged his country of outside influences and the ravages of the past century. Just as Spider-Man is about to destroy Nostromo, Doom activates a code he had implanted in the scout years prior, allowing Nostromo to purge the Phalanx from the Earth. Doom is destroyed along with Magnus and with his final will names Nostromo heir to the throne of Latveria.

Ragnarok Now
Doom is shown searching for a way to prevent the Timestream from collapsing after it is damaged by the efforts of the Earth-616 version of the Red Skull. As reality begins to unravel around him, Doom is rescued by Kang the Conqueror, who recruits him as part of a larger plot against the Apocalypse Twins.

The Black Cabinet
When Doom conquered the United States, he gathered his Black Cabinet, a group of talented and unique individuals:

 Minister of Signal - Indigo Eshun, a brilliant British "Netglider" and head of an elite Cadre of Netgliders. Wire's body was rebuilt and he was Doom's instant link to the Indigo and her Netgliders, though he had become insane and would commit suicide shortly afterwards. Indigo was killed during Herod's coup.
 Minister of Enemy Relations - Nkrumah, a Wakandan mercenary and head of Panther's Rage, a group of elite warriors. Xandra was one of his Panthers.
 Minister of Humanity - Morphine Somers, a mutant activist with the power to age anything he touched thousands of years in mere seconds.
 Minister of Order - Sharp Blue, head of the Guild of Elite mercenaries.
 Minister of Punishment - Jacob Gallows, Punisher 2099, also made head of S.H.I.E.L.D. 2099.

Doom also attempted to recruit the 2099-era Spider-Man to be his Minister of Superhuman Affairs. Doom had less of an impact on the Spider-Man 2099 title, but the 2099 World of Doom special indicated that Spider-Man had indeed accepted the post.

Powers, abilities, and equipment
After his defeat by Tyger Wylde, Doom underwent special surgery: nanotechnology was neurocybernetically added to the nervous system, speeding up those motor responses, allowing him to interface directly with any technology and heal himself from serious injuries. Due to his fragmented memory, Doom's mystical abilities were drastically decreased. Therefore, Doom had to rely on Vox for his natural talents. With his memory restored, he has full access to them again. He possesses extensive knowledge of all sciences, as well as is an expert in robotics, trans-Einsteinian physics, genetic engineering, military technology, chronophysics, biochemistry, and other fields.

Doom wears an adamantium-lanxide laced armor over cybermesh circuitry, enabling tactile interface with nanoids in his brain and bloodstream that he designed with the help from Celia Quinones. It provides him with new capabilities, such as increased strength and durability, a rocket pack for flying, phasing (thanks to the phase shifter linked into his armor's systems), protective force fields, cloaking, and gauntlet particle blasters. His armor also possesses numerous sensors and scanner systems.

Collected editions

Other versions

Deathlok-dominated future
In the pages of "Savage Avengers", an unidentified Earth has its 2099 dominated by Deathloks led by a variation of Ultron who has taken the name Deathlok Prime. Doom 2099 was shown to be an inmate at Hellrock Prison where he was held in a special area. When a time-displaced Dagger comes upon his cell, Doom 2099 is offered a deal to join the Avengers. Doom 2099 accepts so that he can take his revenge on Ultron.

Exiles: World Tour
Doom would find new life during the "World Tour" run of the Exiles series. He is revealed as the current monarch of Latveria and hacks into a public eye camera to offer the Proteus-possessed Hulk a safe haven in Latveria. After Proteus decides to leave, Jordan Boone (the creator of the "Virtual Unreality" portal that Proteus traveled through) is fired from Alchemax, but Doom, intrigued by the thought of inter-dimensional travel, offers Boone a new job.

While the original 2099 imprint is known as Earth-928 in the Marvel Multiverse, this event causes a divergent timeline known as Earth-2992.

Timestorm 2009–2099

Victor Von Doom appears in the Timestorm mini-series that returns to the 2099 universe. In this mini-series he is an aged version of his original universe self that has sustained the world from disaster and has pulled the 2009 versions of Spider-Man and Wolverine into 2099 as his life is nearing an end.

Marvel Knights 2099
An apparently immortal via body-hopping Victor Von Doom appears in Marvel Knights: 2099 that features an alternate take on the 2099 universe. Doom appears in Marvel Knights 2099: Black Panther 2099, where aged and dying, Doom, seemingly employing the mind transferral ability he learned from the Ovoids, seizes the body of his current major domo Lucien in an apparently ongoing program implemented to ensure his continued survival. Donning his trademark armor and declaring "One Doom, One Legacy" the now reborn von Doom incinerates his former incarnation, apparently, though not explicitly stated now containing Lucien's mind, but he does mumble something before his immolation at Doom's hands. Seizing opportunity, the rejuvenated Doom leads a Doombot invasion of Wakanda, which dominates the country for months, until a young council member named K'Shamba fights back. He assumes the mantle of the Black Panther and destroys the rest of the army, seemingly stopping Doom's plans. However the ever-living Lord of Latveria has already won the nation, as K'Shamba is already his unknowing puppet.

References

1993 comics debuts
Characters created by John Francis Moore (writer)
Comics by Warren Ellis
Cyberpunk comics
Defunct American comics
Doctor Doom
Fictional biochemists
Fictional characters who can manipulate time
Fictional characters who can turn intangible
Fictional characters who can turn invisible
Fictional characters with energy-manipulation abilities
Fictional characters with superhuman durability or invulnerability
Fictional illeists
Fictional inventors
Fictional physicists
Fictional presidents of the United States
Fictional roboticists
Fictional technopaths
Latverians
Marvel 2099 characters
Marvel 2099 titles
Marvel Comics characters who use magic
Marvel Comics characters with accelerated healing
Marvel Comics characters with superhuman strength
Marvel Comics cyborgs
Marvel Comics male superheroes
Marvel Comics male supervillains
Marvel Comics scientists
Marvel Comics superheroes
Marvel Comics supervillains
Supervillains with their own comic book titles
Virtual reality in fiction